Juan Manuel Valencia Aponzá (born 20 June 1998) is a Colombian football midfielder.

Club career
Valencia debuted for Cortuluá in the Categoría Primera A in 2016 from their youth academy, before transferring to Bologna in January 2017.

On 12 July 2019, Valencia joined Cesena on loan until 30 June 2020.

On 14 October 2020, he moved to Baltika Kaliningrad on loan.

References

External links
Valencia Serie A Profile
Bologna squad page

1998 births
Living people
Sportspeople from Cauca Department
Colombian footballers
Association football midfielders
Cortuluá footballers
Bologna F.C. 1909 players
Cesena F.C. players
A.C. Reggiana 1919 players
FC Baltika Kaliningrad players
Categoría Primera A players
Serie A players
Serie C players
Expatriate footballers in Italy
Colombian expatriate sportspeople in Italy
Colombian expatriate footballers
Expatriate footballers in Russia